This list of members of the 78th West Virginia House of Delegates lists the members of the House of Delegates for the 78th West Virginia Legislature.

House of Delegates Leadership

List of Members in the House of Delegates by District

Composition 
2007–2009:

See also 
West Virginia House of Delegates
List of members of the 77th West Virginia House of Delegates
List of members of the 79th West Virginia House of Delegates
List of speakers of the West Virginia House of Delegates

External links 
West Virginia Legislature Homepage
WV House of Delegates District Map

West Virginia legislative sessions
M
2007 U.S. legislative sessions
2008 U.S. legislative sessions
78